The Heinkel He 62 was a reconnaissance seaplane designed in Germany in the early 1930s. It was a conventional, single-bay biplane with unstaggered wings of equal span. The pilot and gunner sat in tandem, open cockpits. A few aircraft were supplied to Japan, where Aichi built a version as the AB-5, and used it as the basis for the AB-6, but no series production took place. The AB-5 used a locally produced Nakajima Kotobuki in place of the Siemens engine fitted to the German-built aircraft.

Specifications (He 62)

References
 
 

1930s German military reconnaissance aircraft
Floatplanes
He 062
He 62, Heinkel
Biplanes
Single-engined tractor aircraft
Aircraft first flown in 1932